K-561 Kazan is a  nuclear-powered cruise missile submarine of the Russian Navy. It is the second boat of the project, separated from the first  by 16 years (1993–2009). Considerable changes were made to the initial design. Differences in the project have appeared sufficient to consider it as a new upgraded version Yasen-M. The submarine is named after the city of Kazan. The submarine is deployed with the Russian Northern Fleet.

Design 
The submarine project was developed in the Malachite Design Bureau in Saint Petersburg.

Compared to the first-of-class, Kazan is some  shorter than Severodvinsk, resulting in the deletion of a sonar array from the former's bow. According to one naval analyst, the intention was likely to reduce construction costs without meaningfully reducing the submarine's capabilities. Kazan will also include a nuclear reactor with a newly designed cooling system.

History 
Kazan'''s first crew had been formed in March 2016, and the submarine was originally to be commissioned in 2017. On 23 August 2016, the Sevmash shipyard reported that the submarine would be delivered to the Russian Navy in 2018.

On 31 March 2017, Kazan was rolled out of the construction hall and subsequently launched on the water. It began its sea trials on 24 September 2018 and was expected to join the Russian Navy in 2019. In October 2019, President of the United Shipbuilding Corporation Alexei Rakhmanov, stated that Kazan'''s deployment would delayed until the end of 2020 due to technical issues with its complex control systems.

The submarine's trials included the firing of the 3M-54 Kalibr and P-800 Oniks cruise missiles. They were completed in December 2020.

As of April 2021, the commissioning date was reported to be 25 July 2021. However, the vessel was actually commissioned on 7 May 2021.

References 

Yasen-class submarines
Ships built by Sevmash
2017 ships